Buffalo Bill, William F. Cody, (1846–1917) was an American soldier, buffalo hunter and showman.

Buffalo Bill may also refer to:

People
 William L. Brooks (c. 1832–1874), Western lawman and outlaw
 William Wilson Quinn (1907–2000), U.S. Army lieutenant general
 Jay Wilsey (1896–1961), American actor often credited as Buffalo Bill Jr. in Westerns

Film and TV
 Buffalo Bill (TV series), an American television situation comedy starring Dabney Coleman
 Buffalo Bill (1894 film), a lost black-and-white silent film
 Buffalo Bill (1944 film), a film starring Joel McCrae and Maureen O'Hara
 Buffalo Bill, Hero of the Far West, a 1964 film starring Gordon Scott

Books
 Buffalo Bill (character), the primary villain in the 1988 novel The Silence of the Lambs and its 1991 film adaptation

Places
 Buffalo Bill Dam and reservoir, near Cody, Wyoming, United States
 Buffalo Bill's, a hotel and casino in Primm, Nevada, United States

Music
 "Buffalo Bill", song composed by Alan Hawkshaw with lyrics by Barry Mason, recorded by Washington Flyer in 1979 and Ursuline Kairson in 1980
 "Buffalo Bill", a song by Indeep, Michael Cleveland 1983
 "Buffalo Bill (Part 1)", song by Howard Hughes and The Western Approaches	1986
 "Buffalo Bill", a song by the jam band Phish
 "Buffalo Bill", a song by Eminem from the EP Relapse: Refill
 "Buffalo Bill", a song by Moxie Raia, 2013 single

See also
 Buffalo Bills (disambiguation)